Chinnain Thirugnanadurai (born 1 May 1974) is a retired Indian sprinter.

External links
 

1974 births
Living people
Indian male sprinters